General elections were held in Lebanon on 15 May 2022. The country has for several years been the subject of chronic political instability as well as a serious economic crisis aggravated by the 2020 explosions that hit the Port of Beirut and faced large-scale demonstrations against the political class. 

Hezbollah and their allies lost their parliamentary majority but still won the Parliament speaker election. The Lebanese Christian-based Lebanese Forces led by Samir Geagea made gains and independent candidates promising reforms won 13 seats.

Background

2019–21 protests 

Large-scale antigovernmental demonstrations ignited in the country from 17 October. Initially triggered in response to a rise in gas and tobacco prices as well as a new tax on messaging applications, the demonstrations quickly turned into a revolution against the stagnation of the economy, unemployment, Lebanon's sectarian and hereditary political system, corruption and the government's inability to provide essential services such as water, electricity and sanitation, involving hundreds of thousands of people from every region and sect of the country. Saad Hariri ended up resigning on 29 October 2019.

Hassan Diab was appointed Prime Minister by President Michel Aoun on 19 December 2019. His government obtained the confidence of parliament by 69 votes in its favour.

The country's economic situation continued to deteriorate and the government was indebted over 95 billion dollars by the end of 2020. The Lebanese pound lost 70% of its value in six months and 35% of the active population was unemployed. Riots broke out in Beirut, Tripoli and Jounieh.

Impact of the COVID-19 pandemic 
During the first year of the COVID-19 pandemic, Lebanon could have been considered a success story. Despite the devastating economic impact of lockdowns, including a significant Lebanese lira devaluation in Spring 2020, Lebanon was largely unscathed by COVID-19 until early 2021, when the healthcare system collapsed under a deluge of cases. This only further accelerated the already devastating economic crisis.

Beirut explosion 

On 4 August 2020, the explosion of several thousand tons of ammonium nitrate stored in a hangar in the Port of Beirut caused considerable human and material damage across the city and the port. The final toll was over 235 dead and over 7,000 injured and damage estimated at over $10 billion and estimated to have left 300,000 homeless. The industrial-port zone of the Port of Beirut's badly affected, further aggravating the economic situation. Vital for Lebanon, the port is the most important trading centres in Lebanon which ensures the transit of 60% of the country's imports.

Electorate

Electoral system 
In accordance with the Lebanese practice of political confessionalism, the Lebanese religious communities distribute reserved seats in the different constituencies according to their demographic weight. The distribution of votes is proportional. Once all the ballot papers have been counted, the total of valid votes in each constituency is divided by the number of seats to be filled, which gives the electoral threshold necessary for a list to obtain a seat. The distribution of seats is done between the lists having reached this quorum proportionally according to the percentage of votes obtained, then within the lists in accordance with the denominational quotas and the number of preferential votes obtained by the candidates.

Registered voters 
Preliminary lists of the numbers of voters (15-12-2021):

Lebanese living abroad 

Lebanese living abroad are allowed to participate in legislative elections. Although the Lebanese diaspora is estimated to be as high as 14 million individuals, most of them no longer possess nationality several decades after the waves of emigration that affected the country. Only 225,114 of diaspora had thus registered for the 2022 elections, which is still a significant increase from the 82,000 that registered last election. Although a section of the 2017 electoral law provides for the allocation of six seats apart for the diaspora, their vote is still counted in their constituencies. Lebanese living in the Arab world outside of Lebanon voted on 6 May, meanwhile Lebanese living in the UAE and the rest of the world voted on 8 May. Lebanese people living in 48 countries were reported to have cast their votes.

Candidates 

After the deadline on 15 March 2022, the Ministry of Interior and Municipalities announced a record number 1043 candidates, which include 155 women, had been registered. On April 3, the ministry announced 103 lists running in 15 electoral districts.

Withdrawals 
The Lebanese Forces saw many withdrawals of candidates specifically in Shia dominated areas such as Baalbek-Hermel which was blamed at Hezbollah and the Amal Movement for placing pressure on Shia March 14 candidates. The Kataeb Party also withdrew in Bekaa II electoral district.

Opinion polls 
A poll was conducted by the German Konrad Adenauer Foundation between 10 and 15 of December in 2021 of 1,200 Lebanese citizens eligible for voting. The survey found that nearly 40% of the people polled are willing to vote for an independent or 17 October Revolutionary candidate in the 2022 elections. Next comes Hezbollah and Amal with around 17 percent combined.

The study also found that 44.8% of polled Lebanese will not vote for the same party as they did in 2018. Christian parties Kataeb and the Lebanese Forces had seen a large increase in support in preference percentage compared to the figures of the last elections conducted by candidate and researcher Charbel Nahas in his book ‘Ritualism of the Sectarian Non-State'. In 2018, the Kataeb Party were only favored by 1.9% of the ones conducted compared to 2021's 4.2% and the Lebanese Forces had 7.7% compared to the 2021's 11.5%.

Political parties and coalitions

Future Movement 
On 24 January 2022 Saad Hariri announced that he will suspend his role in Lebanese politics and that he would not run in the 2022 general elections. He also called on the Future Movement to follow suit and not run in the upcoming parliamentary elections nor nominate anyone to run on its behalf.

After Hariri's boycott, many Sunnis in North II and Akkar chose to follow boycott as well, after which his resignation created a large vacuum in Sunni politics.

Many Ex-Future politicians headed their own blocs, such as Bahaa Hariri and Fouad Sinora, and managed to secure 8 seats of the candidates that were affiliated with the Future Movement in parliament.

Kataeb Party 
Candidates were announced on the 20 February 2022 under the campaign slogan Ma minsawim (ما منساوم). Kataeb leader Samy Gemayel insisted that the Kataeb party was the only one that has faced the fact of surrendering to Hezbollah's will, electing Michel Aoun as president and isolating Lebanon from its surroundings. Samy Gemayel emphasized:
On 2 April Nadim Gemayel, cousin of Samy, promoted his candidacy in a speech during a small event.

Kataeb secured 4 seats for Salim Sayegh (3,477 votes), Nadim Gemayel (4,425 votes), Sami Gemayel (10,466 votes), and Elias Hankash (6,148 votes).

Shamalouna 

Shamalouna is a newly established coalition formed by independent groups from the North III electoral district (Bcharre-Zghorta-Batroun-Koura). Currently, the coalition consists of: Osos (Foundations), Koura Independent Community, Al Fekr El Horr (Free Thought), and Al Mashrou’ Al Badeel (The Alternative Project).The coalition took a pioneering unique step to choose its candidates; a round of primary elections through which voters selected their candidates. The primary elections were open to all change groups with no affiliation to mainstream political parties. 

Shamaluna secured the Maronite seat in North III district with Michel Chawki Douaihy with 1,786 votes who is affiliated with the Osos foundation.

Taqaddom 
Taqaddom, which is Arabic for "progress", is a social democratic movement that plans to advocate for social justice and sustainable development. The movement is allied with the Kataeb Party and Michel Moawad, both known for their anti-Hezbollah sentiment. The party presented 2 candidates and managed to win both seats in the Mount Lebanon IV electoral district.

Mada Network and the Secular Clubs 
The Mada Network, a youth organization including secular clubs from various regions, universities, and syndicates, took part in the elections in a decentralized manner in three campaigns: Beirut Tuqawem (Beirut Resists), Al Janoub Youwajeh (The South Confronts), and Jil Al Taghyeer (The Generation of Change), further supporting 5 candidates: Ibrahim Mneimneh, Nuhad Yazbik Dumit and Samah Halwany in Beirut, Ali Khalife in the Tyre-Zahrani district and Verena El Amil in the Matn district. Among these candidates, Ibrahim Mneinmenh won the Sunni seat in Beirut II. While the network primarily constitutes youth, it is known to have a clear political and economic orientation, positioning itself as anti-Hezbollah and left-leaning.

Independence Movement 
The Independence Movement allied with the Kataeb Party and other Anti-Hezbollah independents to form a list called 'Shamal Al Mouwajaha' to bring down Gebran Bassil's presence in the North III electoral districts. The list managed to win 2 seats with the likes of Michel Mouawad and ally Adib Abdelmassih.

MMFD and Qadreen lists 

In the 2022 Lebanese General elections, Citizens in a State (MMFD) hosted candidates in every electoral district in Lebanon in lists called "Qadreen" (Capable) lead by Charbel Nahas of Beirut I. The coalition presented around 60 candidates with some allying with the LCP and other independents of the 17 October revolution.

MMFD was unable to secure any seats but was close with candidate and journalist Jad Ghosn but was defeated by Razi El Hajj by a difference of only 88 votes.

Popular Bloc 
Myriam Skaff, member of a prominent family in the city of Zahle and candidate of the Greek catholic seat, leads a 6-member list in the electoral of Beqaa I but failed to win any seats. In total the list managed to receive 11,501 votes which was 938 more than the last elections.

Rifi Bloc 
Ashraf Rifi, former Hariri ally, Internal Security Forces chief and Justice Minister, broke ranks with Hariri in 2016. In the 2016 Tripoli municipal election, he defeated Hariri's candidates and won 22 out of 24 seats. He fielded his own lists in the parliamentary election, in a move to challenge Hariri's dominance over Sunni politics. Ahead of the elections he profiled himself as a "hawk", unwilling to enter into talks with Hezbollah.

Rifi fielded lists in one electoral district; in North II, while allying with the Lebanese Forces. Ashraf Rifi hopes to lead the Sunni sect of North II amid Hariri's boycott and Mikati's withdrawal. Rifi's list in alliance with the Lebanese Forces secured 3 seats in North II district with Ashraf Rifi getting a Sunni seat with 11,594 votes, Elias Fouad Khoury getting the Maronite seat with 3,426 votes, and Jamil Abboud getting the Greek Orthodox seat with 79 votes.

Lebanese Forces 
The Lebanese Forces presented 23 direct members along with many other allies in every electoral district, with the exception of Beirut II and South III, during the elections with a large anti-Hezbollah sentiment. The Lebanese Forces saw many withdrawal of candidates specifically in Shia dominated areas which was blamed at Hezbollah and the Amal Movement for placing pressure on Shia March 14 candidates. Lebanese Forces secured 19 seats including 1 from Rifi's Bloc and Chamoun.

After securing the most seats in parliament, Samir Geagea also emphasized his pledge not to vote for 30-year incumbent speaker Nabih Berri, citing corruption in the Bloc.

National Liberal Party 
Camille Dory Chamoun announced his candidacy along with 3 others in the districts of Keserwan, Matn, Baabda and Chouf, in alliance with Lebanese Forces Party and the PSP. On April 9, Chamoun participated in launching the list in Abadieh. On May 1, during the opening of its commission headquarters in Keserwan district headed by Chamoun, the party presented its electoral points, which included: sovereignty, positive impartiality, independence of the judiciary, expanded administrative decentralization, restoring confidence in the banking sector, and the return of refugees and displaced persons.

The National Liberal Party was able to secure a single seat through Camille Chamoun in Baabda with 1,876 votes.

Results 
In a statement issued on 17 May 2022, two days after the elections, Interior Minister Bassam Mawlawi announced the results of the 2022 Lebanese parliamentary elections.

Disclaimer: This listing uses a narrow definition of party votes, the preference votes cast for identified party candidates. For an overview of the voting percentages of the lists supported by different parties, see "Results by lists" table below.

Results by alliance and parties

Results by lists

International reactions 

  France – French ambassador to Lebanon Anne Grillo said on Twitter: "My Lebanese friends, on this day that witnesses important elections for the future of your country, you have the opportunity to vote for those who will represent you in Parliament, and they will have the task of defending your rights and aspirations to build the Lebanon you want"
  Armenia – Armenia's Foreign Ministry sent its congratulations to Lebanon on Twitter: "Armenia stands with brotherly Lebanon. Looking forward to deepening our cooperation"
  Arab League – Assistant Secretary-General of the Arab League, Ahmed Rashid Khattabi, met with the minister of information, Ziad Makary, after the general elections and discussed joint social and economic issues within the Arab League. Makary also reiterated Lebanon's intention to host the events of “Beirut the capital of Arab media” for the year 2023 after the election's success.
  United Nations – UN Secretary General Antonio Guterres called on Lebanon to form an inclusive government and to immediate quick reform on the country's dire situation. He said that he: “looks forward to the swift formation of an inclusive government that can finalize the agreement with the International Monetary Fund and accelerate the implementation of reforms necessary to set Lebanon on the path to recovery”. The UN Secretary General also called on the elected parliament to: "urgently adopt all legislation necessary to stabilize the economy and improve governance.”

See also 

 List of members of the 2022-2026 Lebanese Parliament
 2022 Lebanese presidential election
 2022 Speaker of the Lebanese Parliament election
 Lebanese liquidity crisis
 17 October Revolution
 2020 Beirut explosion

External links 

Elections.gov.lb (official website)

Notes

References 

Lebanon
General election
2022 general
May 2022 events in Lebanon